Irvin Enrique Herrera Baires (born 30 August 1991) is a Salvadoran footballer who plays as a forward.

Club career
Irvin Herreras youth career was split between the SYA Copperheads and National Power JBS FC located out of Westchester County, New York.  Herrera was coached at JBS FC by coaching legend Jonathan Langer, While at JBS FC Herrera helped lead JBS FC to a #2 National Ranking and was instrumental in leading JBS FC to multiple tournament titles to include the Annandale Premier Cup, Potomac Memorial Day Tournament, Disney International Cup, as well as other titles.

Herrera played for Santa Tecla in the Primera División of El Salvador from 2014 to 2016, making 42 appearances and scoring 23 goals during league play. Additionally, Herrera played for the club during the 2015–16 CONCACAF Champions League, scoring his team's lone goal in a 2–1 defeat to Real Salt Lake of Major League Soccer.

On February 19, 2016, USL club Saint Louis FC announced their signing of Herrera from Santa Tecla. He scored his first goal for the club on May 7 against the Swope Park Rangers. Two weeks later he became the first Saint Louis FC player to register a hat trick, tallying four goals in a match against the Tulsa Roughnecks, and was named the USL's Player of the Week.

Loan to FAS
In December 2017, Herrera signed with FAS for the Clausura 2018, on loan from Saint Louis FC. In December 2018, Herrera's contract was not renewed by FAS.

International goals
Scores and results list El Salvador's goal tally first.

Honours
 Santa Tecla
 Primera División: Clausura 2015

References

External links
 

1991 births
Living people
Salvadoran footballers
Salvadoran expatriate footballers
Association football forwards
El Salvador international footballers
2015 CONCACAF Gold Cup players
2017 Copa Centroamericana players
Santa Tecla F.C. footballers
Saint Louis FC players
New York Cosmos (2010) players
C.D. FAS footballers
Alianza F.C. footballers
Irvin Herrera
USL Championship players
North American Soccer League players
Irvin Herrera
Liga Nacional de Fútbol de Guatemala players
Southern Wesleyan University alumni
Salvadoran expatriate sportspeople in the United States
Salvadoran expatriate sportspeople in Guatemala
Expatriate soccer players in the United States
Expatriate footballers in Thailand
Expatriate footballers in Guatemala
El Salvador youth international footballers